Vicq-sur-Breuilh is a commune in the Haute-Vienne department in the Nouvelle-Aquitaine region in west-central France.

Geography
The village lies in the middle of the commune, on the right bank of the ruisseau de Vicq, which flows into the Breuilh, a tributary of the Briance, which forms all of the commune's north-western border.

Demographics
Inhabitants are known as Vicquois.

See also
Communes of the Haute-Vienne department

References

Communes of Haute-Vienne